Gholam Mohammad Nousher (born 6 October 1964) is a former Bangladeshi cricketer who played in 9 ODIs from 1986 to 1990. He was Bangladesh's main strike bowler during the 2nd half of the 1980s.

The early years

The tall left armer from Mymensingh played for the Bangladesh Tigers (the unofficial youth team) in 1984, and a year later he was playing for the full national side against Sri Lanka. He celebrated his promotion with the big scalp of Ranjan Madugalle. In January 86, he took the wickets of Ramiz Raja and Shoaib Mohammad.

In ICC Trophy
Though his career was hampered at times by bad injuries, he nevertheless continued on to serve the national side well into the 1990s. He was sorely missed during the 2nd round matches of 1994 ICC Trophy in Kenya, as he was sidelined by an injury.

References

External links 
 https://web.archive.org/web/20120222034651/http://www.thedailystar.net/magazine/2006/05/02/sports.htm

1964 births
Bangladesh One Day International cricketers
Bangladeshi cricketers
Living people
Dacca University cricketers
Cricketers from Dhaka